Open water swimming at the 2017 World Aquatics Championships was held from 15 to 21 July 2017 in Lake Balaton, Hungary.

Schedule
Seven events were held.

All times are local (UTC+2).

Medal summary

Medal table

Men

Women

Team

References

External links
Official website

 
Open water swimming
Open water swimming at the World Aquatics Championships
Open water swimming at the World Aquatics Championships